Abundius and Abundantius (died c. 304) are Christian martyrs who were killed during the Diocletian persecution. Their feast day is celebrated on September 16.

Biography
Abundius was a priest who had earlier resurrected John, the son of Marcianus. Upon hearing of this, the emperor ordered these three, with Abundantius, a deacon, to be beheaded. The executions were carried out at the 26th milestone of the Via Flaminia.

Veneration
Their bodies were later transferred to the church of Cosmas and Damian in Rome. The bodies of Marcianus and John were found around 1001 and transferred to Civita Castellana. There, they were elected to be the city's principal patron saints. In 1583, the relics of Abundius and Abundantius were transferred to the SS. Nome di Gesu, where they were placed under the church's high altar. Aloysius Gonzaga heard mass there before becoming a Jesuit.

See also
Abundius of Umbria – martyred north of Rome in the Diocletian persecution.
Abundius of Palestrina

References

Sources
Holweck, F. G. A Biographical Dictionary of the Saints. St. Louis, MO: B. Herder Book Co. 1924

Year of birth missing
304 deaths
4th-century Christian martyrs
4th-century Romans
Saints duos
3rd-century births
Groups of Christian martyrs of the Roman era
Christians martyred during the reign of Diocletian